Olga Govortsova was the defending champion, but chose to compete in Pelham instead.

Caroline Dolehide won the title after defeating Irina Bara 6–4, 7–5 in the final.

Seeds

Draw

Finals

Top half

Bottom half

References
Main Draw

Space Coast Pro Tennis Classic - Singles